Wilbur Cross may refer to:

 People:
 Wilbur Lucius Cross (1862–1948), American critic, academic, and politician
 Wilbur Cross (author) (1918–2019), American book author
 Connecticut memorials to Wilbur L. Cross:
 The Wilbur Cross, or Wilbur Cross Parkway, Fairfield and  New Haven  counties
 Wilbur Cross, Wilbur Cross High School in New Haven
  Wilbur Cross Highway, Hartford and Tolland counties